The Joseph Miller House is a historic house located on Buckhart Road in Rochester, Illinois. The Federal style house was built by Joseph Miller in 1867; it is one of the oldest surviving homes in Rochester. A wide verandah along the side and a kitchen addition in the back reflect Miller's Virginia ancestry. The Miller family moved from Virginia to the Rochester area in 1835, when Christian Miller bought enough land to become one of the largest landowners in Sangamon County. Joseph, Christian's son, inherited the land in 1842; his descendants remained a prominent landholding family in the area.

The house was added to the National Register of Historic Places on November 24, 1980.

References

Houses on the National Register of Historic Places in Illinois
Federal architecture in Illinois
Houses completed in 1867
National Register of Historic Places in Sangamon County, Illinois
Houses in Sangamon County, Illinois